The 1995 Daytona 500, the 37th running of the event, was held on February 19 at Daytona International Speedway in Daytona Beach, Florida. Dale Jarrett won his first career Winston Cup pole. Sterling Marlin won the race for the second straight year, his second Daytona 500 win, after leading 105 laps, including the final 20.

Background

Daytona International Speedway is a race track in Daytona Beach, Florida that is one of six superspeedways to hold NASCAR races, the others being Michigan International Speedway, Auto Club Speedway, Indianapolis Motor Speedway, Pocono Raceway and Talladega Superspeedway. The track also features two other layouts that utilize portions of the primary high speed tri-oval, such as a  sports car course and a  motorcycle course. The track's  infield includes the  Lake Lloyd, which has hosted powerboat racing. The speedway is owned and operated by International Speedway Corporation.

The track was built by NASCAR founder Bill France, Sr. to host racing that was being held at the former Daytona Beach Road Course and opened with the first Daytona 500 in 1959. The speedway has been renovated three times, with the infield renovated in 2004, and the track repaved in 1978 and 2010.

The Daytona 500 is regarded as the most important and prestigious race on the NASCAR calendar. It is also the series' first race of the year; this phenomenon is virtually unique in sports, which tend to have championships or other major events at the end of the season rather than the start. Since 1995, U.S. television ratings for the Daytona 500 have been the highest for any auto race of the year, surpassing the traditional leader, the Indianapolis 500 which in turn greatly surpasses the Daytona 500 in in-track attendance and international viewing. The 2006 Daytona 500 attracted the sixth largest average live global TV audience of any sporting event that year with 20 million viewers.

Race summary

Opening laps
Outside polesitter Dale Earnhardt led the opening lap for the first time in his Daytona 500 career. Lap 3 saw Sterling Marlin in the Morgan-McClure Motorsports No. 4 car take the lead. The first yellow flag came out on lap 9 when Joe Nemechek (in his first race for his own team) crashed and collected Brett Bodine. Two laps after the restart, IMSA and IndyCar veteran Davy Jones touched with fellow rookie Randy LaJoie exiting turn 4, clipping the wall and spinning the Jasper Motorsports No. 77 car into the pits. Before 30 laps were put on the board, sprint car king Steve Kinser crashed with Phil Parsons. Jeff Gordon took the lead from Marlin during the yellow flag pit stops. After the restart, Mark Martin and 1985 and 1987 winner Bill Elliott stopped for flat tires. On lap 43, John Andretti and 1990 winner Derrike Cope collided exiting turn 2. Both drivers continued with minimal damage, but as Cope came through the tri-oval to catch up to the field, both rear tires suddenly blew out, sending him into a harmless spin but rendering his car disabled as he could get no traction with both rear tires flat. On lap 58, Mike Wallace got loose in turn 2 and tagged Jeff Purvis, sending both cars into the wall and the 1994 and 1993 ARCA 200 winners respectively were finished for the day. Caution flag pit stops resulted in Dave Marcis staying out to lead one lap (a regular practice for Dave), and Mark Martin's Roush Racing crew placed his car in front. On lap 68, Gordon retook the lead.

Mid-race events
On lap 70, rain interrupted the race for 2 hours. Jeff Gordon led Marlin, Todd Bodine, Earnhardt and Ken Schrader when the red flag was withdrawn. On lap 97, Todd Bodine spun exiting turn 4 (whether or not contact with Robert Pressley caused it was unclear), and engine failure soon took him out after the restart. He joined Purvis, Mike Wallace, Kinser Parsons, and Nemechek as the 6 cars out of the race. During the pit stops, Gordon dropped from the lead to 20th after a very long pit stop. Earnhardt was the new leader, and at halfway he led Michael Waltrip, Morgan Shepherd, Marlin and Ken Schrader to the restart. With help from Marlin, the younger Waltrip took the lead from Earnhardt for 2 laps before the defending 500 winner retook the lead. Meanwhile, Gordon was reclaiming lost ground quickly and passed Michael Waltrip in turn 2 on lap 109 to re-enter the top 10.

On lap 131, Dave Marcis hit the turn 3 wall and slowed to a stop in the middle of turns 3 and 4. After the restart, a small dispute developed in his pits centering on the status of his unused tires. The Penske team showed up to make an offer for the tires, but Marcis wanted the tires to go to Richard Childress Racing and Earnhardt, for whom Marcis and his team had done many miles of testing and from whom he had received an engine for the race. "I may not have been in the Daytona 500 if it wasn't for Richard Childress," said Marcis of the former owner-driver.

Going through all of this, Marlin retained the lead until, with 40 laps to go, rookie Randy LaJoie spun on the backstretch and lost his windshield. As the yellow flag was being waved, Bobby Hamilton made contact with Rusty Wallace, resulting in Wallace's fifth straight Daytona 500 crash (4 of which resulted in a DNF, with the 1992 running as the exception). Rick Mast led a lap during the caution. 1989 winner Darrell Waltrip had a transmission failure that would cost him 20 laps to repair. Meanwhile, Gordon suffered an aerodynamic setback that would cost him the race. The jack was let down too soon on the driver's side during the tire change, and the fender was bent by the left front tire. Earnhardt would lead the field to the restart, and afterward, Gordon would brush the wall in his now ill-handling car. He brought the Hendrick Motorsports No. 24 car in for a correctional pit stop and lost a lap.

Finish
With 20 laps to go, Marlin passed Earnhardt for the lead on the back straightaway. With 15 laps to go, Bobby Labonte (in his first race for Joe Gibbs Racing) crashed in turn 1, nearly collecting his older brother Terry. Earnhardt came in for 4 new tires, gambling that maneuverability would be more valuable than track position. Just before the restart, rookie Robert Pressley spun in the short chute before turn 1 after contact from Dick Trickle. When the green was waved Earnhardt quickly re-entered the top 10, and with 10 to go, he was side by side with Ricky Rudd for 9th. He passed Mark Martin for the second position with 4 laps to go, but Sterling Marlin's Chevrolet was not to be denied. This was Sterling Marlin's second Winston Cup win, both of which were in the Daytona 500. Marlin also joined Richard Petty (in the 1974 race) and Cale Yarborough (in 1984 race) as the only drivers who have won back-to-back Daytona 500's; this has not been done (until the 2020 race) when Denny Hamlin joined. Martin went to third while his teammate Ted Musgrave finished fourth and 1993 winner Dale Jarrett (who started on the Pole) finished 5th.

This was Richard Petty's only Daytona 500 as a broadcaster, and the first Daytona 500 to be broadcast with a reduction in availability.   As a result of the Fox affiliate switches of 1994, many markets where CBS lost major affiliates and were relegated to minor affiliates could not receive the race, including three markets where a NASCAR-sanctioned national series races were held -- Atlanta, Milwaukee, and Detroit.  The Atlanta market losses affected North Georgia, where Bill Elliott is based.  The mountainous areas of northern Georgia where Bill Elliott lives could not receive the race because WGCL's signal was easker

Results

References

External links 
Results

Daytona 500
Daytona 500
NASCAR races at Daytona International Speedway